The 1973 LPGA Tour was the 24th season since the LPGA Tour officially began in 1950. The season ran from January 4 to November 4. The season consisted of 34 official money events. Kathy Whitworth won the most tournaments, seven. She also led the money list with earnings of $82,864.

There were four first-time winners in 1973: Jocelyne Bourassa, Mary Lou Crocker, Sharon Miller, and Carole Jo Skala. Mickey Wright won the last of her 82 LPGA events in 1973.

The tournament results and award winners are listed below.

Tournament results
The following table shows all the official money events for the 1973 season. "Date" is the ending date of the tournament. The numbers in parentheses after the winners' names are the number of wins they had on the tour up to and including that event. Majors are shown in bold.

^ - weather-shortened tournament

Awards

References

External links
LPGA Tour official site
1973 season coverage at golfobserver.com

LPGA Tour seasons
LPGA Tour